Sputnik Chinovnika (Russian Cyrillic: Спутник чиновника) was a magazine issued in Kyiv between 1911 and 1914. According to its program, the whole journal was devoted to showing the financial and social status of office workers in the Russian Empire.

References

Defunct magazines published in Russia
Defunct political magazines
Magazines established in 1911
Magazines disestablished in 1914
Mass media in Kyiv
Russian-language magazines
Political magazines published in Russia